Hossainpur is an upazila of Kishoreganj District in the Division of Dhaka, Bangladesh. The city is located on the bank of Brahmaputra river. The distance of Hossainpur is 14 km from Kishoreganj District and 95 km from Dhaka Mohakhali bus station.

History

In 1781, James Reel identified the boundaries of three major areas of Kishoreganj district in the geographical map of undivided Bangladesh. The name of a town is Hossainpur. It was shown as the most important township of ancient Kishoreganj on James Venlen's grid map.

Under the Mughal Emperor Bahadur Shah, this area was known as Alauddin Husain Shah. Hossainpur Upazila was surrounded by the river Narasunda at the southern end of Brahmaputra river at the western end. In the full age of the river, this township was well known in this area due to the expansion of business commerce at one time. Boats often sailed on the outskirts of Hossainpur.

Because of the easy flow of rivers, the British East India Company set up blue cells for indigo cultivation in the village of Pitalganj in Upazila. Even today, the remains of the demolished blue house in Pitalganj village are silent. In the oppression of the blue tax, the people of this population rebelled against the British.

Geography

It has 29,486 households and a total area of 121.29 km2. This is only 14 km distance from the Kishoreganj district. Nandail Upazila of Mymensingh district on the north, Sadar Upazila of Kishoreganj district on the east, Pakundia Upazila on the south, and Gofargaon Upazila of Mymensingh district on the west.

Rivers

In this Upazila, there is the main river named the Brahmaputra. From Kishoreganj a river flows in this area named Norosunda. Actually, this city is situated on the bank of Brahmaputra. There are some small, unknown rivers in this city. Panan bills, Bogra bills, Ragakhali canal, and Barikhal are flowing out of the Upazila.

Demographics
As of the 2011 Bangladesh census, Hossainpur has a population of 191,206. Males constitute 49% of the population, and females 51%. The adult population is 72,824. Hossainpur has an average literacy rate of 90.1% (7+ years), while the national average is 32.4%.
The rate of population growth is 1.26% and the population density of this area is 15.16 (per km).

Economy

The main characteristic of Hossainpur is an agriculture-based economy. More than 60% of people directly relate to agriculture. Rice is the main crop in this area and jute, vegetables, peanut, etc. are popular cultivated products. Hossainpur is not the biggest industrial area but a very comfortable zone for doing business. A huge amount of potato, green chili, red chili, and other products export to the whole country. The other thing the city is popular for is different types of sweets.

Religion

Most people are Muslim with also Hindu, Christian. There are more than 370 mosques in Upazila and three temples. The main mosque in the Upazila is Hossainpur Jame Masjid with other mosques such as Hossainpur Upazila Jame Masjid, Thana Masjid, Murgi Mahal Masjid, Court Masjid. For performing Eid day prayer having a central Eidgah field located in Notun bazar. The main Hindu temple is Sree Sree kuleshori mondir, Sree Sree Narsinhg Jiur AkhraSree Sree kali mondir. For the other religion having a comfortable place of worship.

Sports

Cricket is the favourite game with the local people. Other popular sports include football, basketball, and hockey. Popular traditional games include Kabadi, Daraibadha, and Gullachut. In the flowing season of the Brahmaputra river, a boat race is held on a fixed date. Dhekiya Field is the central field of this Upazila and has some first-class cricket and football players.

Administration
Hossainpur Upazila is divided into Hossainpur Municipality and six union parishads: Araibaria, Gobindapur, Jinari, Pumdi, Sahedal, and Sidhla. The union parishads are subdivided into 73 mauzas and 90 villages.

Hossainpur Municipality is subdivided into 9 wards and 16 mahallas.

Hossainpur municipality was formed on 5 February 2006 with a total area of 5.46 km2 (2.18 square miles) of the largest part of the Araibaria Union and the part of Sidla Union. The total population of the municipal area is 28,206 (according to the 2011 census). 65.44% of the population is educated, 45% of businessmen and employers 30% agricultural, and 25% of the population of other occupations.

Infrastructure

Transport

The transport system of this Upazila is so standard comparing with others. The distance from Hossainpur to Dhaka is about 95 km from the Mohakhali bus stop. The only bus is available to service here to be connected with others or Dhaka. There is no direct train service from this Upazila. Jalshiri Express and Banna Paribahan are two popular buses service in this area. To be connected with Kishoreganj CNG and auto rickshaw are the main vehicle.

Health care

This has an Upazila health Complex, 20 community clinics, 6 union health complex, a few private clinics, and a diagnostic center.

Education

As one of the most popular cities of Kishoreganj, Hossainpur has a good reputation regarding its educational system and growth. There are some historical and popular educational institutes in this upazila.

College
Hossainpur University College
Hossainpur Adarsha Mohila Degree College
Hossainpur Business Management College
Hossainpur Technical College

Secondary schools
Hossainpur Model Pilot School and College
Hossainpur Model Pilot Girls High School
Hossainpur Adarsha High School
Hoglakandi High School 
Akbar Ali Technical School and College
Piplakandi High School
Pitalganj High School
SRD High school
Gobindhapur High school

Madrasah
Madhkhola Senior Fazil Madrasah
Hossainpur Upazaila Sadar Dakhil Madrasah
Ashutia Chamadia Dakhil Madrasah
Gorbishudia Burapir Hossainia Dakhil Madrasah

Others
There are also a few primary and kindergarten schools in this locality.

Media
Saptahik Hossainpur Barta

See also
 Upazilas of Bangladesh
 Districts of Bangladesh
 Divisions of Bangladesh

References

Upazilas of Kishoreganj District